Ninkyob-Nindem (Kaningkom-Nindem) is a dialect cluster of Plateau languages in Nigeria.

References

Ninzic languages
Languages of Nigeria